

Events

Pre-1600
 694 – At the Seventeenth Council of Toledo, Egica, a king of the Visigoths of Hispania, accuses Jews of aiding Muslims, sentencing all Jews to slavery.
1277 – The Treaty of Aberconwy, a humiliating settlement forced on Llywelyn ap Gruffudd by King Edward I of England, brings a temporary end to the Welsh Wars.
1313 – Louis the Bavarian defeats his cousin Frederick I of Austria at the Battle of Gammelsdorf.
1330 – At the Battle of Posada, Basarab I of Wallachia defeats the Hungarian army of Charles I Robert.
1456 – Ulrich II, Count of Celje, last ruler of the County of Cilli, is assassinated in Belgrade.
1520 – More than 50 people are sentenced and executed in the Stockholm Bloodbath.

1601–1900
1620 – Pilgrims aboard the Mayflower sight land at Cape Cod, Massachusetts.
1688 – Glorious Revolution: William of Orange captures Exeter.
1720 – The synagogue of Judah HeHasid is burned down by Arab creditors, leading to the expulsion of the Ashkenazim from Jerusalem.
1729 – Spain, France and Great Britain sign the Treaty of Seville.
1780 – American Revolutionary War: In the Battle of Fishdam Ford a force of British and Loyalist troops fail in a surprise attack against the South Carolina Patriot militia under Brigadier General Thomas Sumter.
1791 – The Dublin Society of United Irishmen is founded.
1799 – Napoleon Bonaparte leads the Coup of 18 Brumaire ending the Directory government, and becoming First Consul of the successor Consulate Government.
1851 – Kentucky marshals abduct abolitionist minister Calvin Fairbank from Jeffersonville, Indiana, and take him to Kentucky to stand trial for helping a slave escape.
1862 – American Civil War: Union General Ambrose Burnside assumes command of the Army of the Potomac, after George B. McClellan is removed.
1867 – The Tokugawa shogunate hands back power to the Emperor of Japan, starting the Meiji Restoration.
1872 – The Great Boston Fire of 1872.
1881 – Mapuche rebels attack the fortified Chilean settlement of Temuco. 
1887 – The United States receives rights to Pearl Harbor, Hawaii.
1900 – Russia completes its occupation of Manchuria with 100,000 troops.

1901–present
1906 – Theodore Roosevelt is the first sitting President of the United States to make an official trip outside the country, doing so to inspect progress on the Panama Canal.
1907 – The Cullinan Diamond is presented to King Edward VII on his birthday.
1913 – The Great Lakes Storm of 1913, the most destructive natural disaster ever to hit the lakes, reaches its greatest intensity after beginning two days earlier. The storm destroys 19 ships and kills more than 250 people.
1917 – The Balfour Declaration is published in The Times newspaper.
1918 – Kaiser Wilhelm II of Germany abdicates after the German Revolution, and Germany is proclaimed a Republic.
1923 – In Munich, police and government troops crush the Nazi Beer Hall Putsch.
1935 – The Committee for Industrial Organization, the precursor to the Congress of Industrial Organizations, is founded in Atlantic City, New Jersey, by eight trade unions belonging to the American Federation of Labor.
1937 – Second Sino-Japanese War: The Chinese Army withdraws from the Battle of Shanghai.
1938 – Kristallnacht occurs, instigated by the Nazis using the killing of German diplomat Ernst vom Rath by Herschel Grynszpan as justification.
1940 – Warsaw is awarded the Virtuti Militari by the Polish government-in-exile.
1953 – Cambodia gains independence from France.
1960 – Robert McNamara is named president of the Ford Motor Company, becoming the first non-Ford family member to serve in that post. He resigns a month later to join the newly-elected John F. Kennedy administration.
1963 – At a coal mine in Miike, Japan, an explosion kills 458 and hospitalises 839 with carbon monoxide poisoning. 
1965 – Several U.S. states and parts of Canada are hit by a series of blackouts lasting up to 13 hours in the Northeast blackout of 1965.
  1965   – A Catholic Worker Movement member, Roger Allen LaPorte, protesting against the Vietnam War, sets himself on fire in front of the United Nations building.
1967 – Apollo program: NASA launches the unmanned Apollo 4 test spacecraft, atop the first Saturn V rocket, from Florida's Cape Kennedy.
1970 – Vietnam War: The Supreme Court of the United States votes 6–3 against hearing a case to allow Massachusetts to enforce its law granting residents the right to refuse military service in an undeclared war.
1979 – Cold War: Nuclear false alarm: The NORAD computers and the Alternate National Military Command Center in Fort Ritchie, Maryland detected purported massive Soviet nuclear strike. After reviewing the raw data from satellites and checking the early-warning radars, the alert is cancelled.
1985 – Garry Kasparov, 22, of the Soviet Union, becomes the youngest World Chess Champion by beating fellow Soviet Anatoly Karpov.
1989 – Cold War: Fall of the Berlin Wall: East Germany opens checkpoints in the Berlin Wall, allowing its citizens to travel to West Berlin.
1993 – Stari Most, the "old bridge" in the Bosnian city of Mostar, built in 1566, collapses after several days of bombing by Croat forces during the Croat–Bosniak War.
1994 – The chemical element darmstadtium is discovered.
1998 – A U.S. federal judge, in the largest civil settlement in American history, orders 37 U.S. brokerage houses to pay US$1.03 billion to cheated NASDAQ investors to compensate for price fixing.
  1998   – Capital punishment in the United Kingdom, already abolished for murder, is completely abolished for all remaining capital offences.
1999 – TAESA Flight 725 crashes after takeoff from Uruapan International Airport in Uruapan, Michoacán, Mexico, killing all 18 people on board.
2000 – Uttarakhand officially becomes the 27th state of India, formed from thirteen districts of northwestern Uttar Pradesh.
2004 – Firefox 1.0 is released.
2005 – The Venus Express mission of the European Space Agency is launched from the Baikonur Cosmodrome in Kazakhstan.
  2005   – Suicide bombers attack three hotels in Amman, Jordan, killing at least 60 people.
2012 – A train carrying liquid fuel crashes and bursts into flames in northern Myanmar, killing 27 people and injuring 80 others.
  2012   – At least 27 people are killed and dozens are wounded in conflicts between inmates and guards at Welikada prison in Colombo.
2020 – Second Nagorno-Karabakh War: An armistice agreement is signed by Armenia, Azerbaijan and Russia.

Births

Pre-1600
 955 – Gyeongjong, Korean king (d. 981)
1383 – Niccolò III d'Este, Marquis of Ferrara (d. 1441)
1389 – Isabella of Valois, queen consort of England (d. 1409)
1414 – Albrecht III Achilles, Elector of Brandenburg (d. 1486)
1455 – John V, Count of Nassau-Siegen, German count (d. 1516)
1467 – Charles II, Duke of Guelders, count of Zutphen from 1492 (d. 1538)
  1467   – Philippa of Guelders, twin sister of Charles II, Dutch duchess consort (d. 1547)
1522 – Martin Chemnitz, German astrologer and theologian (d. 1586)
1535 – Nanda Bayin, king of Burma (d. 1600)
1580 – Johannes Narssius, Dutch physician and poet (d. 1637)

1601–1900
1606 – Hermann Conring, German philosopher and educator (d. 1681)
1664 – Johann Speth, German organist and composer (d. 1719)
  1664   – Henry Wharton, English librarian and author (d. 1695)
1683 – George II of Great Britain (d. 1760)
1697 – Claudio Casciolini, Italian singer and composer (d. 1760)
1719 – Domenico Lorenzo Ponziani, Italian priest, theoretician, and academic (d. 1796)
1721 – Mark Akenside, English physician and poet (d. 1770)
1723 – Anna Amalia, Abbess of Quedlinburg (d. 1787)
1731 – Benjamin Banneker, American farmer, surveyor, and author (d. 1806)
1732 – Jeanne Julie Éléonore de Lespinasse, French businesswoman and author (d. 1776)
1773 – Thomasine Christine Gyllembourg-Ehrensvärd, Danish author (d. 1856)
1799 – Gustav, Prince of Vasa (d. 1877)
1801 – Gail Borden, American surveyor and publisher, invented condensed milk (d. 1874)
1802 – Elijah Parish Lovejoy, American minister, journalist, and activist (d. 1837)
1810 – Bernhard von Langenbeck, German general, surgeon, and academic (d. 1887)
1818 – Ivan Turgenev, Russian author and playwright (d. 1883)
1825 – A. P. Hill, American general (d. 1865)
1829 – Peter Lumsden, English general (d. 1918)
1832 – Émile Gaboriau, French author and journalist (d. 1873)
1840 – Joseph-Adolphe Chapleau, Canadian lawyer and politician, 5th Premier of Quebec (d. 1898)
1841 – Edward VII of the United Kingdom (d. 1910)
1850 – Louis Lewin, German pharmacologist and academic (d. 1929)
1853 – Stanford White, American architect and partner, co-founded McKim, Mead & White (d. 1906)
1854 – Maud Howe Elliott, American activist and author (d. 1948)
1862 – Gigo Gabashvili, Georgian painter and educator (d. 1936)
1869 – Marie Dressler, Canadian-American actress and singer (d. 1934)
1871 – Florence R. Sabin, American medical scientist (d. 1953)
1872 – Bohdan Lepky, Ukrainian author and poet (d. 1941)
1873 – Otfrid Foerster, German neurologist and surgeon (d. 1941)
1874 – Albert Francis Blakeslee, American botanist and academic (d. 1954)
1877 – Enrico De Nicola, Italian journalist, lawyer, and politician, 1st President of the Italian Republic (d. 1959)
  1877   – Muhammad Iqbal, Pakistani philosopher, poet, and politician (d. 1938)
1878 – Ahn Changho, Korean activist and politician (d. 1938)
1879 – Jenő Bory, Hungarian architect and sculptor (d. 1959)
  1879   – Milan Šufflay, Croatian historian and politician (d. 1931)
1880 – Giles Gilbert Scott, English architect, designed the red telephone box (d. 1960)
1883 – Edna May Oliver, American actress (d. 1942)
1885 – Theodor Kaluza, German mathematician and physicist (d. 1954)
  1885   – Velimir Khlebnikov, Russian poet and playwright (d. 1922)
  1885   – Aureliano Pertile, Italian tenor and educator (d. 1952)
  1885   – Hermann Weyl, German mathematician, physicist, and philosopher (d. 1955)
1886 – Ed Wynn, American actor (d. 1966)
1888 – Jean Monnet, French economist and diplomat (d. 1979)
1891 – Louisa E. Rhine, American botanist and parapsychologist (d. 1983)
1894 – Mae Marsh, American actress (d. 1968)
  1894   – Dietrich von Choltitz, General of the German Army during World War II (d. 1966)
1897 – Harvey Hendrick, American baseball player (d. 1941)
  1897   – Ronald George Wreyford Norrish, English chemist and academic, Nobel Prize laureate (d. 1978)
1900 – Oskar Loorits, Estonian author and academic (d. 1961)

1901–present
1902 – Anthony Asquith, English director and screenwriter (d. 1968)
1904 – Viktor Brack, German SS officer (d. 1948)
  1904   – Heiti Talvik, Estonian poet (d. 1947)
1905 – Erika Mann, German-Swiss actress and author (d. 1969)
1906 – Arthur Rudolph, German scientist and engineer (d. 1996)
1913 – Paulene Myers, American actress (d. 1996)
1914 – Thomas Berry, American priest, historian, and theologian (d. 2009)
  1914   – Hedy Lamarr, Austrian-American actress and inventor (d. 2000)
1915 – André François, Romanian-French illustrator, painter, and sculptor (d. 2005)
  1915   – Sargent Shriver, American lieutenant, lawyer, and politician, 21st United States Ambassador to France (d. 2011)
1916 – Martha Settle Putney, American lieutenant, historian, and educator (d. 2008)
1918 – Spiro Agnew, American soldier, lawyer, and politician, 39th Vice President of the United States (d. 1996)
  1918   – Florence Chadwick, American swimmer (d. 1995)
  1918   – Thomas Ferebee, American colonel (d. 2000)
  1918   – Choi Hong Hi, South Korean general and martial artist, co-founded taekwondo (d. 2002)
1919 – Eva Todor, Brazilian actress (d. 2017)
1920 – Byron De La Beckwith, American assassin of Medgar Evers (d. 2001)
  1920   – Philip G. Hodge, American engineer and academic (d. 2014)
1921 – Pierrette Alarie, Canadian soprano and actress (d. 2011)
  1921   – Viktor Chukarin, Ukrainian gymnast and coach (d. 1984)
1922 – Dorothy Dandridge, American actress, singer, and dancer (d. 1965)
  1922   – Raymond Devos, Belgian-French comedian and clown (d. 2006)
  1922   – Imre Lakatos, Hungarian mathematician, philosopher, and academic (d. 1974)
1923 – Alice Coachman, American high jumper (d. 2014)
  1923   – Elizabeth Hawley, American-Nepali journalist and historian (d. 2018)
  1923   – James Schuyler, American poet and author (d. 1991)
1924 – Robert Frank, Swiss-American photographer and director (d. 2019)
1925 – Alistair Horne, English-American journalist, historian, and author (d. 2017)
1926 – Vicente Aranda, Spanish director, producer, and screenwriter (d. 2015)
  1926   – Luis Miguel Dominguín, Spanish bullfighter (d. 1996)
1928 – Anne Sexton, American poet and academic (d. 1974)
1929 – Marc Favreau, Canadian actor and poet (d. 2005)
  1929   – Imre Kertész, Hungarian author, Nobel Prize laureate (d. 2016)
1931 – Whitey Herzog, American baseball player and manager
  1931   – George Witt, American baseball player and coach (d. 2013)
  1931   – Valery Shumakov, Russian surgeon and transplantologist (d. 2008)
1933 – Ed Corney, American professional bodybuilder (d. 2019)
  1933   – Jim Perry, American game show host (d. 2015)
1934 – Ingvar Carlsson, Swedish economist and politician, 29th Prime Minister of Sweden
  1934   – Ronald Harwood, South African author, playwright, and screenwriter (d. 2020)
  1934   – Carl Sagan, American astronomer, astrophysicist, and cosmologist (d. 1996)
1935 – Bob Gibson, American baseball player and coach (d. 2020)
  1935   – David Wolfson, Baron Wolfson of Sunningdale, English businessman and politician
1936 – Bob Graham, American lawyer and politician, 38th Governor of Florida
  1936   – Mikhail Tal, Latvian-Russian chess player and author (d. 1992)
  1936   – Mary Travers, American singer-songwriter (d. 2009)
1937 – Roger McGough, English author, poet, and playwright
  1937   – Donald Trelford, English journalist and academic
  1937   – Clyde Wells, Canadian lawyer and politician, 5th Premier of Newfoundland
1938 – Ti-Grace Atkinson, American author and critic
1939 – Paul Cameron, American psychologist and academic
  1939   – Bryan Davies, Baron Davies of Oldham, English academic and politician
1941 – David Constant, English cricketer and umpire
  1941   – Tom Fogerty, American singer-songwriter and guitarist (d. 1990) 
  1941   – John Singleton, Australian businessman
1942 – Victor Blank, English businessman and philanthropist
  1942   – Tom Weiskopf, American golfer and sportscaster
1944 – Chitresh Das, Indian dancer and choreographer (d. 2015)
  1944   – Phil May, English singer-songwriter (d. 2020)
1945 – Moeletsi Mbeki, South African economist and academic
  1945   – Charlie Robinson, American actor (d. 2021)
1946 – Benny Mardones, American singer-songwriter (d. 2020)
  1946   – Marina Warner, English author and academic
1947 – Robert David Hall, American actor, singer, and pianist
1948 – Bille August, Danish director, cinematographer, and screenwriter
  1948   – Joe Bouchard, American bass player and songwriter 
  1948   – Jane Humphries, English economist, historian, and academic
  1948   – Michel Pagliaro, Canadian singer-songwriter and guitarist
  1948   – Luiz Felipe Scolari, Brazilian footballer and manager
1950 – Parekura Horomia, New Zealand politician, 40th Minister of Māori Affairs (d. 2013)
1951 – Lou Ferrigno, American bodybuilder and actor
1952 – Sherrod Brown, American academic and politician
  1952   – Gladys Requena, Venezuelan politician
  1952   – Jim Riggleman, American baseball player, coach, and manager
1953 – Gaétan Hart, Canadian boxer
1954 – Aed Carabao, Thai singer-songwriter and guitarist 
1955 – Fernando Meirelles, Brazilian director, producer, and screenwriter
  1955   – Bob Nault, Canadian lawyer and politician
1959 – Thomas Quasthoff, German opera singer
1960 – Andreas Brehme, German footballer and manager
  1960   – Demetra Plakas, American drummer 
  1960   – Sarah Franklin, American-English anthropologist and academic
1961 – Jill Dando, English journalist (d. 1999)
1964 – Robert Duncan McNeill, American actor, director, and producer
1965 – Daphne Guinness, English-Irish model and actress
  1965   – Andrei Lapushkin, Russian footballer
  1965   – Bryn Terfel, Welsh opera singer
1967 – Ricky Otto, English footballer
1968 – Nazzareno Carusi, Italian pianist and educator
  1968   – Colin Hay, English political scientist, author, and academic
1969 – Sandra Denton, Jamaican-American rapper and actress 
  1969   – Ramona Milano, Canadian actress
  1969   – Roxanne Shanté, American rapper
  1969   – Allison Wolfe, American singer-songwriter 
1970 – Nelson Diebel, American swimmer and coach
  1970   – Domino, American DJ and producer 
  1970   – Guido Görtzen, Dutch volleyball player
  1970   – Bill Guerin, American ice hockey player and coach
  1970   – Chris Jericho, American-Canadian wrestler
  1970   – Scarface, American rapper and producer 
  1970   – Susan Tedeschi, American singer-songwriter and guitarist 
1971 – David Duval, American golfer and sportscaster
  1971   – Sabri Lamouchi, French footballer and manager
1972 – Eric Dane, American actor
  1972   – Naomi Shindō, Japanese voice actress and singer
  1972   – Corin Tucker, American singer-songwriter and guitarist 
1973 – Alyson Court, Canadian actress and producer
  1973   – Nick Lachey, American singer-songwriter, producer, and actor 
  1973   – Gabrielle Miller, Canadian actress and director
  1973   – Zisis Vryzas, Greek footballer and coach
1974 – Alessandro Del Piero, Italian footballer
  1974   – Giovanna Mezzogiorno, Italian actress
1975 – Gareth Malone, English singer and conductor
  1975   – Mathew Sinclair, New Zealand cricketer
1976 – Tochiazuma Daisuke, Japanese sumo wrestler
1977 – Chris Morgan, English footballer and manager
  1977   – Omar Trujillo, Mexican footballer
1978 – Even Ormestad, Norwegian bass player and producer 
  1978   – Sisqó, American singer-songwriter, producer, and actor 
1979 – Dave Bush, American baseball player
  1979   – Caroline Flack, English television presenter, radio presenter, and model (d. 2020)
  1979   – Adam Dunn, American baseball player
  1979   – Martin Taylor, English footballer
1980 – Vanessa Lachey, Filipino-American television host and actress
  1980   – Dominique Maltais, Canadian snowboarder
1981 – Eyedea, American rapper and producer (d. 2010)
  1981   – Kane Waselenchuk, Canadian racquetball player
  1981   – Jobi McAnuff, Jamaican footballer
1982 – Boaz Myhill, American-Welsh footballer
  1982   – Jana Pittman, Australian hurdler
1983 – Rob Elloway, German rugby player
  1983   – Ted Potter Jr., American golfer
  1983   – Michael Turner, English footballer
1984 – Delta Goodrem, Australian singer-songwriter, pianist, and actress
  1984   – Seven, South Korean singer, dancer, and actor
1985 – Bakary Soumaré, Malian footballer
1986 – Carl Gunnarsson, Swedish ice hockey player
1988 – Nikki Blonsky, American actress, singer, and dancer
1989 – Baptiste Giabiconi, French model and singer
1990 – Nosa Igiebor, Nigerian footballer
1996 – Momo Hirai, Japanese dancer and singer

Deaths

Pre-1600
 959 – Constantine VII, Byzantine emperor (b. 905)
1034 – Oldřich, Duke of Bohemia (b. )
1187 – Emperor Gaozong of Song (b. 1107)
1208 – Sancha of Castile, Queen of Aragon (b. 1154)
1261 – Sanchia of Provence, queen consort of Germany
1286 – Roger Northwode, English statesman (b. 1230)
1312 – Otto III, Duke of Bavaria (b. 1261)
1321 – Walter Langton, bishop of Lichfield and treasurer of England (b. 1243)
1456 – Ulrich II, Count of Celje (b. 1406)
1492 – Jami, Persian poet (b. 1414)
1596 – George Peele, English translator, poet, and dramatist (b. 1556)

1601–1900
1623 – William Camden, English historian and topographer (b. 1551)
1641 – Cardinal-Infante Ferdinand of Austria (b. 1610)
1677 – Aert van der Neer, Dutch painter (b. 1603)
1766 – Unico Wilhelm van Wassenaer, Dutch composer and diplomat (b. 1692)
1770 – John Campbell, 4th Duke of Argyll, Scottish general and politician (b. 1693)
1778 – Giovanni Battista Piranesi, Italian sculptor and illustrator (b. 1720)
1801 – Carl Stamitz, German-Czech violinist and composer (b. 1745)
1848 – Robert Blum, German poet and politician (b. 1810)
1854 – Elizabeth Schuyler Hamilton, wife/widow of Alexander Hamilton and co-founder of the first private orphanage in New York (b. 1757) 
1880 – Edwin Drake, American businessman (b. 1819)

1901–present
1906 – Dorothea Beale, English suffragist, educational reformer and author (b. 1831)
1911 – Howard Pyle, American author and illustrator (b. 1853)
1917 – Harry Trott, Australian cricketer (b. 1866)
1918 – Guillaume Apollinaire, Italian-French author, poet, and playwright (b. 1880)
  1918   – Peter Lumsden, English general (b. 1829)
1919 – Eduard Müller, Swiss lawyer and politician, 26th President of the Swiss Confederation (b. 1848)
1924 – Henry Cabot Lodge, American historian and politician (b. 1850) 
1932 – Nadezhda Alliluyeva, second wife of Joseph Stalin (b. 1901)
1937 – Ramsay MacDonald, Scottish journalist and politician, Prime Minister of the United Kingdom (b. 1866)
1938 – Vasily Blyukher, Russian marshal (b. 1889)
1940 – Stephen Alencastre, Portuguese-American bishop (b. 1876)
  1940   – Neville Chamberlain, English businessman and politician, Prime Minister of the United Kingdom (b. 1869)
1942 – Charles Courtney Curran, American painter (b. 1861)
  1942   – Edna May Oliver, American actress (b. 1883)
1944 – Frank Marshall, American chess player and theoretician (b. 1877)
1951 – Sigmund Romberg, Hungarian-American pianist and composer (b. 1887)
1952 – Philip Murray, Scottish-American labor leader (b. 1886)
  1952   – Chaim Weizmann, Belarusian-Israeli chemist, academic, and politician, 1st President of Israel (b. 1874)
1953 – Louise DeKoven Bowen, American philanthropist and activist (b. 1859)
  1953   – Ibn Saud, Saudi Arabian king (b. 1880)
  1953   – Dylan Thomas, Welsh poet and author (b. 1914)
1956 – Aino Kallas, Finnish-Estonian author (b. 1878)
1957 – Peter O'Connor, Irish long jumper (b. 1872)
1958 – Dorothy Canfield Fisher, American educational reformer, social activist and author (b. 1879)
1962 – Dhondo Keshav Karve, Indian activist and academic (b. 1858)
1968 – Jan Johansson, Swedish pianist (b. 1931)
1970 – Charles de Gaulle, French general and politician, 18th President of France (b. 1890)
1971 – Maude Fealy, American actress and screenwriter (b. 1883)
1972 – Victor Adamson; American director, producer, screenwriter, and actor (b. 1890)
1976 – Armas Taipale, Finnish discus thrower and shot putter (b. 1890)
1977 – Fred Haney, American baseball player, coach, and manager (b. 1898)
1985 – Marie-Georges Pascal, French actress (b. 1946)
1988 – David Bauer, Canadian ice hockey player, coach, and priest (b. 1924)
  1988   – John N. Mitchell, American lieutenant, lawyer, and politician, 67th United States Attorney General (b. 1913)
  1988   – Rosemary Timperley, English author and screenwriter (b. 1920)
1989 – Bill Neilson, Australian politician, 34th Premier of Tasmania (b. 1925)
1991 – Yves Montand, Italian-French actor (b. 1921)
1992 – Charles Fraser-Smith, English missionary and author (b. 1904)
  1992   – William Hillcourt, Danish-American scout leader and author (b. 1900)
  1992   – T. Sivasithamparam, Sri Lankan politician (b. 1926)
1993 – Ross Andru, American illustrator (b. 1925)
1996 – Joe Ghiz, Canadian lawyer, judge, and politician, 27th Premier of Prince Edward Island (b. 1945)
1997 – Carl Gustav Hempel, German philosopher from the Vienna and the Berlin Circle (b. 1905)
  1997   – Helenio Herrera, Argentinian-Italian footballer and manager (b. 1910)
1999 – Mabel King, American actress and singer (b. 1932)
2000 – Sherwood Johnston, American race car driver (b. 1927)
  2000   – Eric Morley, English television host, founded Miss World (b. 1918)
2001 – Niels Jannasch, Canadian historian and curator (b. 1924)
  2001   – Giovanni Leone, Italian lawyer and politician, 6th President of Italy (b. 1908)
2002 – William Schutz, American psychologist and academic (b. 1925)
2003 – Art Carney, American actor and comedian (b. 1918)
  2003   – Gordon Onslow Ford, English-American painter (b. 1912)
  2003   – Binod Bihari Verma, Indian physician and author (b. 1937)
2004 – Iris Chang, American historian, journalist, and author (b. 1968)
  2004   – Emlyn Hughes, English footballer and manager (b. 1947)
  2004   – Stieg Larsson, Swedish journalist and author (b. 1954)
2005 – K. R. Narayanan, Indian journalist and politician, 10th President of India (b. 1921)
2006 – Ed Bradley, American journalist (b. 1941)
  2006   – Ellen Willis, American journalist and activist (b. 1941)
  2006   – Markus Wolf, German intelligence officer (b. 1923)
2008 – Hans Freeman,  Australian bioinorganic chemist and protein crystallographer (b. 1929)
  2008   – Huda bin Abdul Haq, Indonesian terrorist (b. 1960)
  2008   – Amrozi bin Nurhasyim, Indonesian terrorist (b. 1962)
  2008   – Miriam Makeba, South African singer and activist (b. 1932)
2012 – Milan Čič, Slovak lawyer and politician, 5th Prime Minister of the Slovak Socialist Republic (b. 1932)
  2012   – Joseph D. Early, American soldier and politician (b. 1933)
  2012   – Sergey Nikolsky, Russian mathematician and academic (b. 1905)
  2012   – James L. Stone, American colonel, Medal of Honor recipient (b. 1922)
2013 – Savaş Ay, Turkish journalist (b. 1954)
  2013   – Helen Eadie, Scottish politician (b. 1947)
  2013   – Grethe Rytter Hasle, Norwegian biologist and academic (b. 1920)
  2013   – Kalaparusha Maurice McIntyre, American saxophonist (b. 1936)
  2013   – Steve Prescott, English rugby player (b. 1973)
  2013   – Emile Zuckerkandl, Austrian-American biologist and academic (b. 1922)
2014 – Rubén Alvarez, Argentinian golfer (b. 1961)
  2014   – Saud bin Muhammed Al Thani, Qatari prince (b. 1966)
  2014   – R. A. Montgomery, American author and publisher (b. 1936)
  2014   – Myles Munroe, Bahamian pastor and author (b. 1954)
  2014   – Orlando Thomas, American football player (b. 1972)
  2014   – Joe Walsh, Irish politician, Minister for Agriculture, Food and the Marine (b. 1943)
2015 – Carol Doda, American actress and dancer (b. 1937)
  2015   – Ernst Fuchs, Austrian painter, sculptor, and illustrator (b. 1930)
  2015   – Tommy Hanson, American baseball player (b. 1986)
  2015   – Byron Krieger, American fencer (b. 1920)
  2015   – Andy White, Scottish drummer (b. 1930)
2016 – Greg Ballard, American basketball player and coach (b. 1955)
2017 – Chuck Mosley, American singer songwriter (b. 1959)
  2017   – Shyla Stylez, Canadian pornographic actress (b. 1982)
2021 – Max Cleland, American politician (b. 1942)

Holidays and observances
 Birthday of Muhammad Iqbal (Pakistan)
 Christian feast day:
 Benignus of Armagh
 Dedication of the Archbasilica of St. John Lateran, Cathedral of the Pope (memorial feast day)
 Margery Kempe (Church of England)
 Martin Chemnitz (Lutheran)
 Nectarios of Aegina
 Theodore of Amasea (Roman Catholic Church)
 Virgin of Almudena (Madrid)
 Vitonus
 November 9 (Eastern Orthodox liturgics)
 Flag Day (Azerbaijan)
 Independence Day, celebrates the independence of Cambodia from France in 1953.
 Inventors' Day (Germany, Austria, Switzerland)
 Uttarakhand Day (Uttarakhand, India)
 World Freedom Day (United States)

See also
 November 9 in German history

References

External links

 
 
 

Days of the year
November